Nirendranath Chakravarty (19 October 1924 – 25 December 2018) was a contemporary Bengali poet, Translator, Novelist. 
He lived in Bangur Avenue, Kolkata.

Biography 

He was born in Faridpur district of undivided Bengal in 1924. After graduating from the University of Calcutta, he started journalism in the daily "Raiyah". He won the Sahitya Academy Award in 1974 for the book of poems Ulanga Raja (The Naked King). In 2007, the University of Calcutta awarded him an honorary Doctor of Literature degree. Chakravarty also wrote few detective novels of Bhaduri Moshai.

Notable works

Poetry anthology
Some of his poetry anthologies are:
Neel Nirjan
Nirokto Karabi
Andhokar Baranda
Prothom Nayok
Somoy baro kom
Jabotiyo Valobasi

Shrestho Kobita
Kobita Samagro 1
Kobita Samagro 2

Juvenile literature
Saada Bagh
Bibir Chora
Baaro Maser Chora
Pitri Purush
Amalkanti

Some of his popular poems are
Amalkanti Roddur Hotay Cheyachilo
Kolkatar Jisu
Ulanga Raja

He also translated Hergé's  "The Adventures of Tintin" in Bengali.

Death
Chakravarty died on 25 December 2018 at 12:25 pm following a heart attack. He was 94 years old, and at the time, was suffering from breathing problem in the last few months.

References

1924 births
2018 deaths
Bengali detective fiction writers
Bengali writers
Recipients of the Sahitya Akademi Award in Bengali
St. Paul's Cathedral Mission College alumni
University of Calcutta alumni
Indian magazine editors
Indian male writers
Indian children's writers
Poets from West Bengal
Novelists from West Bengal
Writers from Kolkata